Len Hustler (30 September 1920 – 14 September 1981) was an Australian rules footballer who played with Collingwood in the Victorian Football League (VFL).

Notes

External links 	
	
		
Profile on Collingwood Forever

		
1920 births
1981 deaths
Australian rules footballers from Victoria (Australia)		
Collingwood Football Club players